Justin Omoregie (born 21 September 2003) is an Austrian professional footballer who plays as a midfielder for Austrian Bundesliga club Red Bull Salzburg.

International career
Omerogie was born in Austria to a Nigerian father and Polish mother. He is a youth international for Austria.

Career statistics

Club

Notes

References

2003 births
Living people
Austrian footballers
Austria youth international footballers
Austrian people of Nigerian descent
Austrian people of Polish descent
Association football defenders
2. Liga (Austria) players
First Vienna FC players
FK Austria Wien players
FC Red Bull Salzburg players
FC Liefering players